Jay Mathers Savage (born August 1928 in Santa Monica, California) is an American herpetologist known for his research on reptiles and amphibians of Central America. He is a past president of the American Society of Ichthyologists and Herpetologists, the Society of Systematic Biologists, and the Southern California Academy of Sciences. He received his bachelor's (1950), master's (1954), and doctoral (1955) degrees from Stanford University. He has produced around 200 publications, including the books Evolution (Holt, Rinehart and Winston, 1968) and The Amphibians and Reptiles of Costa Rica (University of Chicago Press, 2002). He is an emeritus professor at the University of Miami and adjunct professor at San Diego State University.

Savage is commemorated in the scientific names of 18 animal species, as well as the frog genus Barycholos (from the Greek word for "savage"). Reptile species named in his honor include Diplodactylus savagei, Pseuderemias savagei, Sonora savagei, and Sphaerodactylus savagei.

References

Further reading

External links
Jay M. Savage, University of Miami.

1928 births
American herpetologists
People from Santa Monica, California
Living people
San Diego State University faculty
University of Miami faculty
Stanford University alumni
20th-century American zoologists
21st-century American zoologists